A Water wheel is a machine for converting falling or flowing water into useful power.

Water wheel or Waterwheel may also refer to:
Paddle steamer, or paddle wheel ship, a ship driven by a paddle wheel or wheels in the water 
Noria, a machine for lifting water into an aqueduct
Watermill, a factory or industrial process driven by water power 
Waterwheel plant, common name for the plant Aldrovanda vesiculosa
"Waterwheel", a composition by Ralph Towner from his 1978 album Batik
The WaterWheel Foundation, a charitable organization for the band Phish

See also
 Water Mill (disambiguation)
 Wheel (disambiguation)
 Water (disambiguation)